Catherine Martin may refer to:
 Cathie Martin (born 1955), professor of plant sciences at the University of East Anglia
 Catherine Martin (designer) (born 1965), Australian costume designer, production designer, set designer and film producer
 Catherine Martin (piper), Irish piper
 Catherine Martin (journalist) (born 1919), journalist for The West Australian
 Catherine Edith Macauley Martin (1848–1937), Australian novelist
 Catherine Martin (politician), Irish Green Party politician
 Catherine Martin (director), Canadian film director and screenwriter

See also
 Kate Martin (disambiguation)
 Kathy Martin (disambiguation)
 Martin (name)